Spectrum Health Hospitals Butterworth Hospital is a hospital in Grand Rapids, Michigan.  Founded in 1875 as St. Mark's Home and Hospital, begun by parishioners of St. Mark's Episcopal Church, the current Butterworth Hospital is a subsidiary of Spectrum Health.  The hospital is a teaching affiliate of the Michigan State University College of Human Medicine.  The emergency department is a level I trauma center for both adults and pediatrics.

References

External links
Spectrum Health Butterworth Hospital website

Hospitals in Michigan
Buildings and structures in Grand Rapids, Michigan
Teaching hospitals in Michigan
Trauma centers